Pavel Pavlovich Eigel (born 1 March 1990) is a Russian slalom canoeist who has competed at the international level since 2005.

Eigel won a bronze medal in the K1 event at the 2018 ICF Canoe Slalom World Championships in Rio de Janeiro. He also won the overall World Cup title in the Extreme K1 in 2018, the first season when this event counted for world cup points.

He finished 9th in the K1 event at the 2016 Summer Olympics in Rio de Janeiro. At the 2020 Summer Olympics in Tokyo he participated in both the C1 and the K1 events, even though he does not normally compete in C1. He finished in the last 18th position in the C1 event after only starting in the first heat. He then finished 20th in the K1 event after being eliminated in the semifinal.

World Cup individual podiums

References

External links

1990 births
Living people
Russian male canoeists
Canoeists at the 2016 Summer Olympics
Canoeists at the 2020 Summer Olympics
Olympic canoeists of Russia
Sportspeople from Moscow